Virtual Weapon (also known as Cyberflic) is a 1997 Italian comedy-science fiction film, directed by Antonio Margheriti.

Cast 

Terence Hill as Skims
Marvin Hagler as Mike
Giselle Blondet as Chelo
Jennifer Martinez as Lily
Tommy Lane as  Shepard
Richard Liberty as Captain Holmes

References

External links

1990s Italian-language films
Films directed by Antonio Margheriti
Italian science fiction comedy films
Films about virtual reality
Films about computing
Films about telepresence
Films about technological impact
1990s science fiction comedy films
1997 comedy films
1997 films
1990s Italian films